Paschal Sweeney (born in 1912 in Woodville) was an Australian clergyman and bishop for the Roman Catholic Diocese of Vanimo. He was elected Provincial of the Passionist Fathers in 1952, and subsequently moved to Papua New Guinea to take up mission work. He was appointed bishop in 1966. He died in 1981.

References 

1912 births
1981 deaths
Australian Roman Catholic bishops
Roman Catholic bishops of Vanimo